Nasa-Arab is a 12" single by Coil vs. The Eskaton. The Eskaton, however, is another alias of Coil. Eskaton is also the name of a record label that was run by Coil.

Background
The song "Nasa-Arab" originally appeared in a shorter form on the album Stolen & Contaminated Songs. "First Dark Ride" would later appear on Unnatural History III.

The following people are credited for participating on this release: John Balance, Peter Christopherson, Danny Hyde and Drew McDowall.

The catalogue number for this release is Eskaton 001. It was released only in the United Kingdom.

The vinyl is etched as follows:
 Side A: The Responsible Abuse of Pleasure
 Side B: Hide Amongst Yourselves

Track listing
Side A
 "Nasa-Arab" – 12:22
Side B
 "First Dark Ride" – 10:50

References

External links
 
 
 Nasa-Arab at Brainwashed

1994 albums
Coil (band) albums